Mutsumi (むつみ, 六実, 睦, ムツミ, 六ツ美) is a Japanese name. It is both a family name and a given name, most often for females but sometimes also for males.

Given name:
 Mutsumi Fukuhara, Japanese singer
 Mutsumi Fukuma, Japanese actress
, Japanese mezzo-soprano
 Mutsumi Inomata, Japanese animator
 Mutsumi Sasaki, Japanese manga artist
 Mutsumi Takahashi, Canadian-Japanese journalist
 Mutsumi Takayama, Japanese figure skater
, Japanese footballer
Mutsumi Tamura (born 1987) Japanese voice actress

Surname:
 Goro Mutsumi, Japanese actor

Fictional characters:
 Mutsumi, from Utawarerumono
 Mutsumi Aasu, from Puni Puni Poemy
 Mutsumi Akiyoshi, from Dear Boys
 Mutsumi Otohime, from Love Hina
 Mutsumi Saburo, from Sgt. Frog

See also
 7837 Mutsumi, a main-belt asteroid
 Mutsumi Station, a Japanese railway station
 Mutsumi, Yamaguchi, a former village
 Mitsumi

Japanese feminine given names
Japanese-language surnames
Japanese unisex given names